U.S. Highway 90 Alternate is an alternate route to U.S. Highway 90 in the U.S. state of Texas, running from west of Seguin east via Seguin, Gonzales, Hallettsville, Eagle Lake, Rosenberg and Sugar Land to northeastern Houston. South of Downtown Houston, US 90 Alternate is built to freeway and near-freeway standards along a section of South Main Street.

Route description

US 90 Alternate begins at U.S. Highway 90 and Farm to Market Road 464 west of Seguin and heads east through downtown Seguin on Court Street. (US 90 travels on Kingsbury Street, just 15 blocks to the north.) From Seguin to Rosenberg, US 90 Alternate passes through mainly rural areas.

Just west of downtown Rosenberg, it merges with Spur 529, part of US Highway 59 until 1976. US 59 used to run concurrent with US 90 Alternate between Rosenberg and southwest of downtown Houston, but it was relocated to the US 59 as construction of the freeway between Houston and Rosenberg was completed in stages from 1961 to 1976. In 2017, US 90 Alternate and FM 1640 were converted to a one-way pair in Rosenberg, with US 90 Alternate carrying westbound traffic and FM 1640 carrying eastbound traffic.

After Rosenberg, US 90 Alternate passes through Richmond, Sugar Land, Stafford and Missouri City before entering Houston. US 90A in Sugar Land between State Highway 6 and the Southwest Freeway is an 8 lane boulevard with at-grade signalized intersections. A section in Stafford from the Southwest Freeway to Promenade Boulevard (east of Dulles Avenue) is a short controlled access highway similar in design to the one which stretches from Present Street to the South Loop. There it crosses the Sam Houston Tollway into the Houston city limits and becomes South Main Street. A few miles down, the highway meets the current northern terminus of the Fort Bend Toll Road. The short controlled-access highway portion of US 90 Alternate—part of which has local access (right-in/right-out), but no median breaks – currently begins east of Present Street in Stafford just before the Sam Houston Tollway and ends just short of Interstate 610. These portions were previously a four-lane divided highway with exterior shoulder lanes, crossovers, and at grade crossings with major thoroughfares.

North of I-610, US 90A becomes the widest street in Houston with 10 through lanes and several turning lanes. This section, previously a four-lane divided highway, was upgraded to its current width between 1999 and 2001. The 10 lane right of way of US 90A between the Old Spanish Trail (OST) and the South Loop was planned to ease access to the NRG Park (formerly Reliant Park and the Astrodomain) complex parking lots west of NRG Stadium. Further north, US 90A splits from South Main Street onto the OST, becoming a six lane boulevard heading east to cross State Highway 288 (South Freeway) with a grade separated street-to-street intersection with Griggs Road, and meets the southern terminus of Spur 5 adjacent to the campus of the University of Houston. After crossing Spur 5, it turns into a four-lane undivided road, crossing Brays Bayou and turning northeast onto Wayside Drive, crossing Interstate Highway 45 (Gulf Freeway). Between Polk Street until after crossing over the ship channel, it divides into two one-way streets.  US 90 Alternate West (southbound) is Wayside Drive while US 90 Alternate East (northbound) goes down S/SGT Macario Garcia Drive (formerly 69th Street). At Interstate Highway 10/U.S. Highway 90 (East Freeway), US 90 Alternate turns east to multiplex with I-10/US 90 for a short jog, then turning north onto McCarty Street. US 90 Alternate ends at the junction with Interstate Highway 610 in northeastern Houston, where Business U.S. Highway 90-U continues northeast on McCarty Street.

History
US 90 Alternate was designated on May 25, 1942, replacing SH 343. On March 28, 1952, the section from Columbus to Eagle Lake became part of FM 102. US 90A was instead rerouted over portions of SH 200 and SH 3.

Major intersections

References

External links
Feldstein, Dan. "South Main widening to `super street' may start in late '97/8-lane road not without opponents concerned with traffic, noise." Houston Chronicle. Monday August 12, 1996. A17.
Staff. "Squeeze to be put on South Main commuters." Houston Chronicle. Thursday July 13, 2000. A27.

90 Alternate (Texas)
90 Alternate
Alternate (Texas)
090 Alternatea
Transportation in Harris County, Texas
Transportation in Fort Bend County, Texas
Transportation in Wharton County, Texas
Transportation in Colorado County, Texas
Transportation in Lavaca County, Texas
Transportation in Gonzales County, Texas
Transportation in Guadalupe County, Texas
Seguin, Texas
Rosenberg, Texas
Sugar Land, Texas
Missouri City, Texas